Nebria hellwigii chalcicola is a subspecies of beetle in the family Carabidae that is endemic to Austria.

References

Beetles described in 1949
Beetles of Europe
Endemic fauna of Austria